Run Fast is the debut album by The Julie Ruin, released on September 3, 2013.

Track 3, "Just My Kind," was mixed by James Murphy of LCD Soundsystem.

Critical reception

Run Fast received generally favorable reviews from music critics.

Track listing
All music composed by Kathleen Hanna, Sara Landeau, Kenny Mellman, Kathi Wilcox and Carmine Covelli. Lyrics by Kathleen Hanna and Kenny Mellman.
 "Oh Come On" – 2:25
 "Ha Ha Ha" – 3:18
 "Just My Kind" – 3:51	
 "Party City" – 3:27	
 "Cookie Rd." – 3:35	
 "Lookout" – 3:07	
 "Right Home" – 3:06	
 "Kids in NY" – 2:27	
 "Goodnight Goodbye" – 4:22	
 "South Coast Plaza" – 3:00	
 "Girls Like Us" – 3:19	
 "Stop Stop" – 2:46	
 "Run Fast" – 5:19

Personnel
 Kathleen Hanna – vocals
 Sara Landeau – guitar
 Kenny Mellman – keyboards, vocals
 Kathi Wilcox – bass guitar
 Carmine Covelli – drums

References

2013 debut albums
The Julie Ruin albums
Dischord Records albums